Ntuli v Donald was a 2010 privacy case involving Take That singer Howard Donald in which the singer attempted to use a privacy injunction to prevent details of a former relationship being made public.

See also
Super-injunctions in English law

References

External links
Bailii

English privacy case law
2010 in England
2010 in case law
2010 in British law
Court of Appeal (England and Wales) cases